A Koreatown (Korean: 코리아타운), also known as a Little Korea or Little Seoul, is a Korean-dominated ethnic enclave within a city or metropolitan area outside the Korean Peninsula.

History
Koreatowns as an East Asian ethnic enclave have only been in existence since the mid 1860s, as Korea had been a territorially stable polity for centuries; Jaeeun Kim describes it, "The congruence of territory, polity, and population was taken for granted." Large-scale emigration from Korea was only mainly into the Russian Far East and Northeast China; these emigrants became the ancestors of the 2 million Koreans in China and several hundred thousand ethnic Koreans in Central Asia.

Koreatowns in the western countries such as the United States, Canada have only been in place much later with the Los Angeles Koreatown receiving official recognition in 2008. Also many Koreatowns are not officially sanctioned where the only evidence of such enclaves exist as clusters of Korean stores with Korean signage existing only on the storefronts. In the 1992 Los Angeles riots, many Korean businesses were targeted where the signage only served to point out targets for rioters. In Philadelphia's Koreatown, anti-Korean sentiment was so strong that official signage was often vandalized as residents protested the "official recognition" of such areas, making many Koreatowns across the western countries never having official statuses that many Chinatowns receive today. Many Koreatowns today exist in a suburban setting as opposed to the urban settings of Chinatown mainly because many ethnic Koreans, especially in the western countries, fear crime that is often associated with the city dwellings and the higher quality of schools as education is often a top priority, which is why the Philadelphia Koreatowns exist in suburban settings such as Cheltenham, Pennsylvania instead of its original location in the Olney section of Philadelphia.

Characteristics
The features described below are characteristic of many modern Koreatowns.

Korean signage

Many modern Koreatowns will exhibit the usage of the Korean language and Hangul on storefront signs sometimes on official highway signage.  Officially sanctioned Koreatowns may also exhibit signs in the local language. In English, the word "Koreatown", "Little Korea" and "Korea Way" can sometimes be seen, as in the case with the Los Angeles Koreatown. As Korean is the official language of South Korea and North Korea as well as one of the two official languages in China's Yanbian Korean Autonomous Prefecture, there are approximately 80 million people who speak Korean worldwide. For over a millennium, Korean was written with adapted Chinese characters called hanja, complemented by phonetic systems like hyangchal, gugyeol and idu. In the 15th century, a national writing system called hangul was commissioned by Sejong the Great, but it only came into widespread use in the 20th century, because of the yangban aristocracy's preference for hanja.

Most historical linguists classify Korean as a language isolate

 while a few consider it to be in the controversial Altaic language family. The Korean language is agglutinative in its morphology and SOV in its syntax.

Korean restaurants

Many Koreatowns will have stores that serve Korean cuisine, usually serving as the major differentiator between other East Asian and Southeast Asian ethnic enclaves such as Chinatown and Little Saigons. The Korean national cuisine known today has evolved through centuries of social and political change. Originating from ancient agricultural and nomadic traditions in Southern Manchuria and the Korean Peninsula, Korean cuisine has evolved through a complex interaction of the natural environment and different cultural trends.

Korean cuisine is largely based upon rice, vegetables and meats. Traditional Korean meals are noted for the number of side dishes (banchan) that accompany steam-cooked short-grain rice. Kimchi is served often, sometimes at every meal. Commonly used ingredients include sesame oil, doenjang (fermented bean paste), soy sauce, salt, garlic, ginger, pepper flakes and gochujang (fermented red chili paste).

Locations

Korean demographics

Many Koreatowns are actual ethnic enclaves where nearly four-fifths of migrant Koreans live in just three countries: China, the United States and Japan. Other countries with greater than 0.5% Korean minorities include Australia, Canada, Kazakhstan, New Zealand, and Uzbekistan. All these figures include both permanent migrants and sojourners. If one focuses on long-term residents, there were about 5.3 million Korean emigrants as of 2010.

Americas

Argentina

Buenos Aires's 'Barrio Coreano' is in the neighborhood of Flores, specifically in the south of this neighborhood. The primary artery of the district is Avenida Carabobo, which houses various Korean businesses and organizations, including restaurants, beauty salons, a Korean school (Instituto Coreano Argentino) and churches, among others.
In recent years, there has been a huge move from the Bajo Flores towards the Avellaneda Avenue, the reason being the increasing theft and insecurity around the slums close to Avenida Castanares. What some might call these days "The New Koreatown" has been increasing in size at a faster rate while the shops in Avenida Carabobo have been closing.
There are over 22,000 Koreans in Argentina, most of them in Buenos Aires, where the Asian population is around 2.5%.

Brazil

Brazil has several Korean enclaves but, recently a Koreatown was formed in Bom Retiro a densely populated area of Brazil's biggest city, São Paulo.

The city of Fortaleza in Ceará state hosted many immigrants from South Korea in Brazil.

The Korean consulate in Brazil said that the municipal government in São Paulo has designated Bom Retiro as 'Koreatown' and could pass an ordinance that will see the city provide administrative and financial support to the new community.

Chile

The Korean population of Chile is mostly concentrated in Patronato in Santiago.  Currently, approximately 3000 Koreans live in Chile.
The Korean community is well organized and united.  Colonia Coreana organizes several events annually.  Among these events are: soccer tournaments, Korean festivals, and the annual Mr. and Ms. Patronato.

Mexico

Mexico has a large Korean population that lives in and around Zona Rosa in Mexico City. According to the newspaper Reforma, there are at least 1,000 Koreans living in Zona Rosa and about 3,000 total in Colonia Juárez, the larger official neighborhood of which Zona Rosa is a part.  The area around Hamburgo, Praga, Florencia, and Biarritz streets converted into “Pequeño Seul,” or Little Seoul in the 1990s before receding since then.

Canada

Toronto, Ontario
Toronto officially designated the area on Bloor Street from Bathurst Street to Christie St. as Koreatown in 2004.[12] According to the 2001 census Toronto had roughly 43,000 Koreans living in the city,[13] and in 2011 the numbers have grown to 64,755.[14] The Korean community in Toronto has developed Koreatown such that it offers a Korean grocery store,[15]hairdressers, karaoke bars and a multitude of restaurants.[16] The City of Toronto describes Koreatown as "primarily a business district offering a wide range of Korean restaurants, high-end-fashion Korean boutiques, herbalists, acupuncturist and many other unique services and shops which are filled with made-in-Korea merchandise."[12] Koreatown Toronto is also known for its Spring Dano Festival, which is run on the 5th day of 5th month of the Korean Lunar Calendar. The festival is run is the Christie Pits area and has been run for the past 21 years with the exception of 2013 when it was cancelled.[12][17] Today, although many Koreans work in the area, very few Koreans actually live there. An influx of Latino immigrants is changing the demographics of the area today.

Koreatown North is the unofficial name for the area situated along Yonge Street from Sheppard Avenue in North York, an administrative area in northern Toronto, to the Clark Avenue in neighboring Thornhill, Ontario. This area does not have official signage as they are mixed with establishments catering to Persians and Chinese clientele.

Vancouver, British Columbia
The highest concentration of Koreans is found near Lougheed Town Centre in Burnaby, British Columbia and in the adjacent city of Coquitlam. Along the North Road (from Delestre Ave (South) to Burquitlam Skytrain Station (North)), sizable supermarkets such as Hannam Supermarket and H mart, hair shops, Korean restaurants, bars, law firms, accountants' offices, realty offices, child care, clinics and auto repair shops are to be found. For a few years, following the housing boom, the number of Korean Canadians has increased in Langley, Surrey, Port Coquitlam, Maple Ridge, Mission and Abbotsford, and more businesses are opening up shops and offices in east Metro Vancouver and Fraser Valley.

United States

The first large group of Korean Immigrants settled in America between 1901 and 1905. Between those years 7,226 immigrants, including 6,048 men, 637 women, and 541 children, came on 65 trips. Most of the early immigrants of that period had some contract with American missionaries in Korea. For some Western-oriented Korean intellectuals, immigrating to the United States was considered useful, in part, to help them in the modernization of their homeland. Consequently, the recruiter for labourers for the Hawaiian Sugar Planters' Association (HSPA), David Deshler, had no trouble finding Koreans from a wide range of social classes willing to sail to Hawaii.

San Francisco, Dinuba, and Riverside, California have a claim as the first Korean U.S. settlement.

Atlanta, Georgia
Atlanta has a population of approximately 50,000 individuals of Korean descent. Atlanta's Koreatown is mostly centered around the corridor extending from Duluth, Georgia, westward along Buford Highway into northeast Atlanta. KoreanBeacon named Atlanta #5 in its list of Top Korean-American cities, citing the Korean population in Gwinnett County, GA (which contains Duluth) doubling over the past decade, in addition to large stretches of Buford Highway being populated with retail and services with many signs in Korean. Atlanta also has four Korean-language television stations broadcast in the Atlanta area, in addition to a local daily Korean newspaper, the Atlanta ChoSun.

Aurora, Colorado
Roughly two thousand Korean immigrants live in Aurora, and the stretch of Havana Street running from Mississippi Avenue to Iliff Avenue contains a very high number of Korean businesses. A motion to designate the surrounding area as an official Koreatown was at one time considered by the Aurora City Council.

Baltimore, Maryland

There is a small portion of lower Charles Village, referred to as the Station North Arts and Entertainment District, is sometimes referred to as Koreatown or Little Korea and is home to a number of Korean restaurants, but it has not been officially designated as a Koreatown. This developing Koreatown is bounded on the north by 24th Street, on the south by North Avenue, on the west by Maryland Avenue, and on the east by St. Paul Street. Meanwhile, suburban Ellicott City, Maryland and Catonsville, Maryland has also developed Koreatowns, along Route 40.

Boston, Massachusetts
Boston's Koreatown is in Allston Village and includes parts of Cambridge Street and Brighton, Harvard, and Commonwealth Avenues, with a growing Korean and Korean American residential and commercial presence.

Chicago, Illinois
Chicago's Albany Park neighborhood has been referred to as Chicago's "Koreatown" since the 1980s. The majority of Korean shops in Albany Park can be found along Lawrence Avenue (4800 North) between Kedzie (3200 West) and Pulaski (4000 West). This particular section of Lawrence Avenue has been officially designated by the city of Chicago as "Seoul Drive" because of the multitude of Korean-owned enterprises on the street. Although many of the Korean Americans in the neighborhood have been moving to the north suburbs in recent years, it still retains its Korean flavor. Every year there is a Korean festival, and the neighborhood is home to a Korean television station (WOCH-CD Ch. 41) and radio station (1330 AM) as well as two Korean-language newspapers. There are still many Korean businesses interspersed among the newer Mexican bakeries and Middle Eastern grocery stores. Approximately 45% of the businesses on this particular stretch of Lawrence Avenue are owned by Korean-Americans.

Columbus, Ohio

Koreatown is in the vicinity of Bethel and Henderson Roads in Northwest Columbus. This area includes several Korean grocery stores, churches, and restaurants.

Dallas, Texas
Dallas has the largest Korean-American community in Texas and second (to Atlanta) in the southern United States. A sizable Koreatown can be found in Dallas, though this mostly commercial area of the city has not been officially designated as such. Instead, large signs situated at the intersection of Harry Hines Boulevard and Royal Lane proclaim the area as the Asian Trade District. The signs also feature depictions of a red and blue "taeguk," a symbol that is prominently featured on the national flag of South Korea, thereby acknowledging the specifically Korean affiliation of the district. This area in the Northwest part of the city is characterized by a large number of Korean-owned businesses serving the city's sizable Korean-American community, concentrated along a 1.5 mile strip of Royal Lane between Luna Rd and Harry Hines Blvd.  Although Korean business is undoubtedly the most dominant in the area, there are isolated Chinese and Vietnamese businesses as well. Another Koreatown can be found in Carrollton, Texas, which is part of the greater DFW area. This area is referred to as "New Koreatown" by locals, due to it growing from the arrival of Hmart to the city. Over the years, more and more restaurants and shops have opened around the Hmart.

Honolulu, Hawaii
Korean businesses congregate on Keeaumoku Street, which earned the nickname "Koreamoku." As of 2016 it has been officially designated as a Koreatown. Roughly bounded by Kalakaua Ave (East), Kapiolani Blvd. (South), King St. (North) and Keeaumoku St. (West).

Houston, Texas

Spring Branch in Houston is considered to have the largest Koreatown in the Houston area.

Orange County, California

Koreatown (also referred to as Little Seoul or the Korean Business District on nearby street signage) is on Garden Grove Boulevard between Beach Boulevard (Route 39) and Brookhurst Street in Garden Grove, Orange County, California. The Korean population in Orange County more than doubled between 1990 and 2010.

Los Angeles, California

The Greater Los Angeles Area is home to the largest number of ethnic Koreans outside of the Korean Peninsula. Koreatown is an officially recognized district of the city and contains probably the heaviest concentration of Korean residents and businesses. However, when the term "Koreatown" is used it usually refers to a larger area that includes the adjacent neighborhoods of Wilshire Center, Harvard Heights and Pico Heights. Koreans began to move into the area in the late 1960s after changes in US immigration laws as part of the greater Civil Rights Movement (especially the Immigration and Nationality Act of 1965 which formally ended the Chinese Exclusion Act), establishing numerous businesses, although never outnumbering Latino residents. In the aftermath of the 1992 riots, Koreatown entered into a period of development, especially during the 1994 Asian Market Crisis as South Korean investors sought to invest in the then-profitable California real-estate market. More recently, L.A.'s Koreatown has been perceived to have experienced declining political power secondary to re-districting and an increased crime rate, prompting an exodus of Koreans from the area.

New York metropolitan area
As of the 2010 United States Census, the self-identified Korean American population in the metropolitan New York Combined Statistical Area was 218,764, the second largest population of ethnic Koreans outside Korea.

According to the 2011 American Community Survey, there were approximately 100,000 Korean Americans in New York City, with two-thirds living in borough of Queens. In particular, Fresh Meadows is home to the most Korean immigrants of any neighbourhood in the city. In Bergen County, New Jersey, where several towns are home to significant Korean populations, the survey counted 63,247 Korean Americans or 6.9% of the total population. The Korean population in borough of Manhattan has nearly doubled to approximately 20,000 since the 2000 Census.

As of 2014, there were 180 franchisees of Korean coffeehouse chain Caffe Bene in the metro area. Korean Air and Asiana Airlines provide non-stop flights from Seoul to JFK Airport.

Manhattan

In Midtown Manhattan, Koreatown is bordered by 31st and 33rd Streets, Fifth Avenue, and the Avenue of the Americas, close to the Empire State Building and Macy's at Herald Square. The heart of the district is the block of 32nd Street between Fifth Avenue and Broadway, officially nicknamed "Korea Way", which features stores on multiple stories, with small, independently run establishments reaching up to the third or fourth floors, including restaurants, exuding an ambience of Seoul. The New York City Korean Chamber of Commerce estimates there to be more than 100 small businesses on the block. It is home to numerous restaurants that serve both traditional and/or regional Korean cuisine and Korean fusion fare (including Korean Chinese cuisine), several bakeries, grocery stores, supermarkets, bookstores, consumer electronics outlets, video rental shops, tchotchke and stationery shops, hair and nail salons, noraebang bars, nightclubs, as well as cell phone service providers, internet cafés, doctors' offices, banks, and hotels. Approximately twelve 24/7 restaurants conduct business on Korea Way. According to the 2000 Census, a slightly larger area including Koreatown was 46 percent Asian. Koreatown is expanding eastward toward Madison Avenue in Midtown Manhattan.

Long Island

The Long Island Koreatown is one of the largest and fastest growing ethnic enclaves outside Korea. The core of this Koreatown originated in the Flushing neighborhood borough of Queens. It has continued to expand rapidly eastward through the neighborhoods of Murray Hill, Bayside, Douglaston and Little Neck, and into adjacent suburban Nassau County, Long Island. In the 1980s, a continuous stream of Korean immigrants many of whom began as workers in the medical field or Korean international students moved to New York City to find or initiate professional or entrepreneurial positions. They established a foothold on Union Street in Flushing between 35th and 41st Avenues, featuring restaurants and karaoke (noraebang) bars, grocery markets, education centers and bookstores, banking institutions, offices, electronics vendors, apparel boutiques and other commercial enterprises. As the community grew more affluent and rose in socioeconomic status, Koreans moved eastward along Northern Boulevard, buying homes in more affluent and less crowded Queens neighborhoods and Nassau County, bringing their businesses with them. The eastward pressure was created in part by the inability to move westward due to the formidable presence of the enormous Flushing Chinatown centered on Main Street. The expansion led to the creation of an American Meokjagolmok or Restaurant Street, around the Murray Hill station of Long Island Rail Road station which is reminiscent of Seoul. According to The New York Times, a "Kimchi Belt" stretches along Northern Boulevard and the Long Island Rail Road tracks, from Flushing into Nassau County; while according to a Korean food chef, "Queens is the closest you can come to authentic Korean food". The Long Island Koreatown features numerous restaurants that serve both traditional and/or regional Korean cuisine. Korean Chinese cuisine is also available in the Long Island Koreatown.

Bergen County

Koreans began moving to Eastern Bergen County, New Jersey in the 1980s and by the 1990s, several enclaves were established. According to the 2010 Census, Bergen County had the highest per capita population of Koreans of any United States county, at 6.3%, including all of the nation's top ten municipalities by percentage of Korean population.  In 2012, the county mandated the publication of voting ballots in the Korean language.
The two most prominent Koreatowns are centered along Broad Avenue in Palisades Park and Leonia, Ridgefield and around the intersection of Main Street and Lemoine Avenue in Fort Lee, close to the George Washington Bridge. Both districts have developed dining destinations for Korean cuisine, while Broad Avenue in Palisades Park has evolved into a dessert destination as well. Koreatown, Palisades Park has been nicknamed the Korean village and Koreatown on the Hudson. The Chusok Korean Thanksgiving harvest festival has become an annual tradition celebrated in Overpeck County Park. Korean chaebols have established North American headquarters operations in Bergen County, including Samsung, LG Corp, and Hanjin Shipping. Korean professionals have also expanded northward into the Northern Valley area and more recently, into adjacent Rockland County, New York. Route 303 in Tappan, New York, Rockland County, has become the hub of Korean activity in the Lower Hudson Valley area.

Oakland, California

The largest concentration of Korean businesses and community services in the San Francisco Bay Area is centered on Oakland's Telegraph Avenue between 20th and 35th Streets between Downtown Oakland and the Temescal district. Roughly 150 Korean-owned businesses are located in the neighborhood, including a shopping center and Korean American community centers. This segment of Telegraph Avenue is lined with bright banners proclaiming the district as "Koreatown-Northgate" with the slogan "Oakland's got Seoul" and accompanied by an annual cultural festival. Officially named "Koreatown-Northgate", the area was characterized by urban decay before Korean Americans began opening businesses and reviving the area in the late 1980s and early 1990s. Before 1991, the area was characterized by homelessness and crime and was known as the Northgate district. The aftermath of the Los Angeles Riots of 1992 also saw a large number of Koreans from Southern California moving to the Bay Area and opening businesses and buying property in the district on a large scale. There has been criticism from the non-Korean residents about the city officially naming the district Koreatown, mostly from the African American population who form the majority in the area. Despite Korean Americans owning much of the property in the neighborhood, the largest group of residents still remains African American. Tensions remain between African Americans and Koreans in the neighborhood, which has witnessed declines in both populations. Despite some Koreans continuing to move into the neighborhood, the majority of the Bay Area's Korean population is concentrated in the suburbs surrounding Oakland and in the South Bay.

Philadelphia, Pennsylvania

Philadelphia's first Koreatown is located in the Olney section of the city. Since the late 1980s, the Korean community has expanded to the north and now straddles the border between Philadelphia proper and the suburb of Cheltenham, though many Korean American businesses and organizations and some residents remain in Olney and adjoining neighborhoods. Upper Darby Township, bordering West Philadelphia, also has a large Korean American population; meanwhile, a rapidly growing Korean population and commercial presence has emerged in nearby suburban Cherry Hill, New Jersey since 2010, centered along Marlton Pike.

Washington, D.C.
Koreatown in Annandale, Virginia starts at the intersection of Little River Turnpike and Hummer Road, runs for 1.5 miles to the turnpike's intersection with Evergreen Lane and provides a hub for the 93,787 individuals of Korean descent residing in the Washington-Baltimore-Northern Virginia, DC-MD-VA-WV Combined Statistical Area, as estimated by the 2009 American Community Survey. According to the Boston Globe, over 1,000 Korean-owned businesses are in Annandale. They cater to Koreans as well as non-Koreans. Businesses and establishments include accountants, banks, bakeries, billiards, bookstores, churches, college preparatory classrooms, cybercafés, department stores, newspapers, optometrists, real estate offices, restaurants and salons.

East Asia

Mainland China

The population of Koreans in China include millions of descendants of Korean immigrants with citizenship of the People's Republic of China, as well as smaller groups of South and North Korean migrants, with a total of roughly 2.3 million people as of 2009. China has the largest ethnic Korean population living outside mainland Korea.

Beijing

There are roughly 200,000 Koreans living in Beijing, including 120,000 Chosŏnjok/Joseonjok (ethnic Korean citizens of China) and about 80,000 South Korean migrants. Prominent areas include Wudaokou and Wangjing.

There are two Koreatowns in Beijing: The bigger Korean enclave is in Wangjing in the Chaoyang district. There are many Korean companies who have established their businesses in Wangjing. Wangjing also has an all-Korean international school (all grade levels) in the Wangjing vicinity. Many of the Korean businesses in Wangjing cater towards families, businessmen, students and tourists with restaurants, bath houses/spas, bookstores, clubs/bars, golfing and Korean banks. Although Wangjing is known as a Korean district, there is a great number of third- and fourth-generation Korean Chinese ethnic minorities who live and coexist with South Korean nationals.

The second Koreatown, Wudaokou, is in the Haidian district where most of the city's universities are. Because of the vibrant university scene in Wudaokou, there are many Korean college students who live and attend universities in this area.

Although the Korean districts are on different ends of the city, Wangjing and Wudaokou are connected by subway line 13.

Qingdao
An estimated 182,000 ethnic Koreans live in Qingdao, Shandong Province, including 134,000 Chosŏnjok/Joseonjok and 48,000 South Korean migrants.

Shenyang

Shenyang has a large Koreatown known as Xita/Sŏtap/Seotap meaning Western Pagoda. Both North and South Korea have consulates in Shenyang but in different districts.

Shanghai 

86,000 Koreans live in Shanghai, including 65,000 Chosŏnjok/Joseonjok and 21,000 South Korean migrants. Longbai in the Minhang district, to the west of the city, has a Korean-oriented neighborhood.

Hong Kong

In 2011, there were 13,288 individuals of Korean descent in Hong Kong. Kimberley Street in Tsim Sha Tsui has Korean restaurants and grocery stores; and is known by the local nicknames Korean Street and Little Korea.

Japan

During the Korea under Japanese rule, approximately 2.4 million ethnic Koreans emigrated to Japan. Some for economic reasons and some were forced to move during the Second World War to work as laborers. While most departed after the war, still many chose to remain and were joined in the 1950s by a wave of refugees from Jeju Island. Today, Koreans, known as Zainichi Koreans (Chaeilchosŏnin/Jaeil-Joseon-in, who on paper retain the nationality of the old Korea) or Zainichi Koreans (Chaeil-han-guk-in/Jaeil Hangug-in, who have adopted South Korean nationality), are the second ethnic minority in Japan, amounting to 430,000 in 2020. Those with North Korean ties are a key source of remittances to North Korea. There is a separate group of more recent migrants from South Korea with strong links to their home country, and there is a considerable cultural gap between these so-called "newcomers" and the Zainichi Koreans.

Osaka

The Korean enclave in the city of Osaka, numbering over 60,000, is the largest in Japan, concentrated in the Ikuno Ward, where 16% of the inhabitants are of Korean origin. Tsuruhashi in the Ward is the largest Koreatown in Japan and is dominated by Jeju Islanders. Imazato-Shinchi is an area increasingly dominated by recent South Korean "new-comers". The total Korean population in Osaka prefecture amounted to 95,000 in 2021.

Tokyo

According to official statistics in 2020, the Korean population in Tokyo amounted to 92,000, which was the second largest following that of Osaka.

Tokyo's Korean-oriented commercial centre is located in the district of Okubo around the area of Shin-Okubo Station and Okubo Station in Shinjuku Ward. Shinjuku Ward itself has over 9,300 registered Korean residents, representing over 10% of the registered Korean residents in Tokyo.  Unlike other Japanese Koreatowns, the Okubo Koreatown developed after World War II and is dominated by "new-comers" - recent immigrants from South Korea who have retained their ethnic and cultural identity, as can be seen from the ubiquitous signs written in hangul.

One of the contributing factors in the development of Okubo into a Korean area was the low rents. The low rents and willingness of landlords to accept foreign tenants attracted Korean and other Asian migrants to the area. These businesses cater to the migrant community and increasingly Japanese who come to experience ethnic cuisine. Other immigrants from China, Taiwan, Southeast Asia, and various other nationalities including Muslim and Nepali operated stores make this one of the most colourful and multicultural areas in Tokyo.

The area around Mikawashima station on the Jōban Line, to the north of the city, is a Koreatown dominated by Zainichi immigrants from Jeju island.

Also noteworthy is a smaller-scale Zainichi Korean quarter to the southeast of Ueno station, and to the southwest, a community of South Korean "new-comers".

Shimonoseki
Green Mall in Shimonoseki, Yamaguchi is a Koreatown. It is also known as "Little Pusan" partly because of the Kanpu ferry that goes to the city of Pusan in South Korea.

Taiwan

A small Koreatown exists in Zhongxing Street located in Yonghe District, New Taipei City

Southeast Asia

Indonesia

A 31,000 m2 Koreatown block is being constructed on north Jakarta Pulomas. Upon its completion, it will be the first artificially made Koreatown in the world with 7 blocks and 9 buildings.

Koreans in Indonesia number approximately 40,000, which makes Indonesia the 12th largest country with Koreans living outside Korea.

Malaysia

Kuala Lumpur

There are more than 20,000 Koreans living in the capital of Malaysia. Sri Hartamas is an affluent residential township in the city which houses many migrants families, particularly from Korea. There are two Korean supermarkets in the area - Seoul Mart and Lotte Mart, various Korean restaurants and many Korean hair salons. Malaysia's first officially registered school for Korean nationals, the Malaysia Korean School, was established on 7 December 1974; it had 26 teachers and enrolled 148 students as of 2006. It is located on Jalan Ampang.

Sabah

About 1,800 to 2,000 Koreans reside in Sabah, most of them in the state's capital of Kota Kinabalu. Sabah Oil and Gas Terminal project in Kimanis, Papar has brought South Korean employees of Samsung Engineering to work and live there until the terminal completion in December 2013. Around 200,000 South Korean tourists came to Malaysia in 2006; Kota Kinabalu was their most popular destination.

Sarawak
There were also some North Koreans working and living in the mine industry on Sri Aman.
This was revealed after a tragedy that killed one and injuring seven others North Koreans in 2014.

Philippines

The most well-known Koreatown in the Metro Manila area is located in Makati's Barangay Poblacion. Most of the Korean businesses can be found in the area bounded north-south by JP Rizal Avenue and Jupiter, and east-west by Makati Avenue and Rockwell Drive, with P. Burgos running roughly through the middle of the area. In Quezon City, the Kalayaan Plaza Building has various Korean businesses, apartments and a church (one of seven or eight Korean churches in QC that existed in 2005).

On Angeles, Pampanga. Anunas is the barangay that houses the city's Koreatown, a chain of Korean establishments along the Fil-Am Friendship Highway. Anunas is also identified as one of the growth centers of the city, focusing on light industries such as woodcarving and rattan craft.

Currently, Manila Mayor Isko Moreno and South Korea Ambassador to the Philippines Kim Inchul are in talks about establishing a "Korea Town" in Manila's Malate district

Singapore

There are Koreatowns in the Upper Bukit Timah area and the Tanjong Pagar area due to the large number of Koreans living in these two areas. Koreans in Singapore formed a population of 16,650 individuals as of 2010, according to the South Korea's Ministry of Foreign Affairs and Trade.

Thailand

There is one Koreatown in Bangkok near Sukhumvit Soi 12 and one in Phuket.
It consists mainly of North Korean refugees and South Korean expatriates, along with a number of South Korean immigrants who have naturalised as citizens of Thailand and their descendants.

Vietnam

Koreans in Vietnam is a community of Vietnam with a population of Korean migrants along with Vietnamese citizens of Korean ancestry. The population initially came in a military capacity, fighting on both sides of the Vietnam War. After the end of the war, there was little Korean migration or tourism in Vietnam, until the rise of the South Korean economy and the decline of the North resulted in an influx of South Korean investors and North Korean defectors, as well as South Korean men seeking Vietnamese wives. As of 2011, according to statistics of South Korea's Ministry of Foreign Affairs and Trade, they numbered roughly eighty thousand people, making them the second-largest Korean diaspora community in Southeast Asia, after the Korean community in the Philippines and the tenth-largest in the world. A more recent estimate from Vietnam Television says their population might be as large as 130,000.

Central Asia

Kazakhstan

Europe

United Kingdom

London

The south west London suburb of New Malden is home to the largest population of both South Koreans and North Koreans in Europe. One-third of New Malden residents are Korean and the town is a cultural hub for Koreans in the United Kingdom. Korean businesses include two large supermarkets (H Mart and Korea Foods), several corner shops, cafés, karaoke bars, travel agents, hair dressers, butchers and over 20 restaurants.

Oceania

Australia and New Zealand

Sydney

Koreatown in central Sydney is located around Pitt Street between Bathurst and Goulburn Streets and Liverpool Street between George and Elizabeth Streets. The area contains many retail businesses such as restaurants, grocers, travel agents, and bars on a block between Liverpool Street. Koreatown, along with the adjacent Thai Town, emerged in the early 21st century, decades after Chinatown was established nearby in 1980.

Sydney's other Koreatowns, established earlier than the CBD one, include a concentration of Korean shops and restaurants around the secondary transport hub of Strathfield railway station, also sometimes referred to as "Little Korea", as well as parts of Eastwood and Campsie (said to be the first), which is home to the Sydney Korean Society. These areas feature a concentration of restaurants and shops catering to Korean cultural needs, as well as number of Korean-speaking businesses.

In 2016, the three local government area with the largest number of people who identified as having Korean ancestry were the City of Parramatta (at 11,770, 5.2% of the total), City of Ryde (at 5,811, 5.0% of the total), and Cumberland Council (at 5,272, 2.44% of the total), while the one with the highest percentage of Korean ancestry was the Municipality of Strathfield (at 3,682, 9.13% of the total).

Melbourne
Melbourne's de facto Koreatown is concentrated around the vicinity of La Trobe Street, specifically Healeys Lane.
It also now has a distinct pocket on Victoria Street North Melbourne directly opposite the Victoria Market.

See also

 Korean American
 Chinatown
 Japantown
 Little Saigon
 Little Manila
 Little India
 List of named ethnic enclaves in North American cities
List of named ethnic enclaves in Philippine cities

References

Citations

Sources

External links

 Sign Language: Colonialism and the Battle Over Text, a law journal paper about zoning ordinances in several New Jersey towns and their effects on Korean businesses
 Asian-Nation: Asian American Ethnic Enclaves & Communities by C.N. Le, Ph.D.
 'Koreatown' Image Divides A Changing Annandale, from the Washington Post